Greatest Hits (subtitled Entertainment Through Pain) is a compilation of Throbbing Gristle material.

Track listing
 "Hamburger Lady" – 4:11
 "Hot on the Heels of Love" – 4:21
 "Subhuman" – 2:58
 "AB/7A" – 4:49
 "Six Six Sixties" – 2:07
 "Blood on the Floor" – 1:16
 "20 Jazz Funk Greats" – 2:42
 "Tiab Guls" – 4:19
 "United" – 4:05
 "What a Day" – 4:36
 "Adrenalin" – 4:01
 (untitled) – 0:39

References

1981 greatest hits albums
Throbbing Gristle compilation albums
Rough Trade Records compilation albums